Renal protein reabsorption is the part of renal physiology that deals with the retrieval of filtered proteins, preventing them from disappearing from the body through the urine.

Almost all reabsorption takes place in the proximal tubule. Only ~1% is left in the final urine.

The proteins cross the apical membrane by endocytosis. They are subsequently degraded in lysosomes. The remaining free amino acids are transported across the basolateral membrane by amino acid transporters.

Overview table

References

Renal physiology